The Haydenettes are a senior-level synchronized skating team representing Hayden Recreation Centre in Lexington, Massachusetts, United States. They are five-time bronze medalists at the World Synchronized Skating Championships, earning the title in 2010, 2011, 2012, 2013, and 2016. Formed in 1979 by Lynn Benson, the Haydenettes are the most successful synchronized skating team in U.S. history, with 28 U.S. National titles.

Team
Members of the Haydenettes are required to have mastered advanced figure skating skills, including senior-level moves, gold-level pattern dances, and at least novice freestyle. The Hayden teams draw skaters from around the world, though the teams are composed primarily of skaters from the greater Boston area. The Haydenettes practice at both the Hayden Recreation Center in Lexington, Massachusetts, the New England Sports Center in Marlborough, Massachusetts, and The Skating Club of Boston in Norwood, Massachusetts. Synchronized skating is sanctioned by U. S. Figure Skating (USFS) and the International Skating Union (ISU), the two governing bodies for all skating events in the U.S. and internationally, respectively.

Associated teams
Hayden Figure Skating Club fields currently nine divisions in synchronized skating that compete under sanctioning by USFSA. Each of the teams appear in various ice shows, exhibitions and other events around the country.

Hayden Figure Skating Club has eight synchronized skating teams at eight competitive levels:
 Mini Shooting Stars, Beginner
 Shooting Stars, Preliminary
 Shooting Stars, Pre-Juvenile
 Mini Mates, Juvenile
 Star Mates, Intermediate (Novice in 2019 and 2020)
 Ice Mates, Novice (Intermediate in 2019 and 2020)
 Lexettes, Junior
 Hayden Select, Elite 12 Senior
 Haydenettes, Senior

Coaches
The Haydenettes are coached by Saga Krantz and assistant coach Lee Chandler.

Saga Krantz
A resident of Boston, Saga Krantz has been head coach for the Haydenettes since 2005. From 2000 to 2004, Krantz was director of Helsingin Taitoluisteluklubi (HTK) in Helsinki, Finland. Under Krantz's coaching, the HTK senior team Rockettes won World silver, Finnish National gold and silver medals and the junior team Team Fintastic won Finnish National gold medal. Saga Krantz was also recognized as the 2008 PSA Synchronized Coach of the Year. Krantz speaks Finnish, English, and Swedish.

Practice
The Haydenettes practice for about 8.5 hours on ice per week during the school year, with an average for the year of 10 hours per week. Additionally, the Haydenettes hold at least two off-ice practices per week. Prior to a competition, the team practice time is increased to 12 hours per week.

Competitive results
The Haydenettes are 28-time National champions, eleven-time ISU World Championship competitors, and five-time ISU World Bronze Medalists. The Haydenettes have represented the U.S. in every World Championship since the International Skating Union (ISU) sanctioned the first World Championship event in 2000. The team's success has earned it the nickname "The Haydenettes Dynasty."

During 2003, the Haydenettes led a contingent of three teams to France where they won The French Cup for the U.S. In addition, the United States contingent won The Nations Cup, awarded to the highest scoring country in this competition. Their awards include the Bronze medal in the 2005 Prague Cup and the Silver medal in the 2004 Neuchâtel Trophy in Switzerland.

The Haydenettes were the 2010 national champions with a score of 231.14, the highest-ever posted to date at the U.S. Synchronized Skating Championships by nearly 18 points. They went on to win the bronze medal at the World Championships held in Colorado Springs, Colorado in 2010. The team won their second bronze at the 2011 World Championships in Helsinki, Finland. They earned their third World bronze in 2012 in Gothenburg and fourth consecutive World bronze in Boston in 2013.

Competitive results (1999–2010)

Competitive results (2010–20)

Programs

Rosters

References

External links 

 Hayden Teams official site
 International Skating Union
 ISU Synchro rules

Senior synchronized skating teams
Sports teams in Massachusetts
World Synchronized Skating Championships medalists